Shagin is a Russian surname that may refer to:

 Alex Shagin (born 1947), Soviet and Russian coin designer
 Anton Shagin (born 1984), Russian actor
 Dmitry Shagin
 Ivan Shagin
 Vladimir Shagin
 Shagin Law Group, a law firm in Harrisburg, Pennsylvania, founded in 1996 as Shagin and Anstine by Craig Shagin

References 

Russian-language surnames